New rue21, LLC (rue21) is an American specialty retailer of women's & men's casual apparel and accessories headquartered in the Pittsburgh suburb of Warrendale, Pennsylvania. Its clothes are designed to appeal to people who desire, wish, or feel to be 21. In 2013, Apax Partners, a global private-equity firm, acquired the company by funds advised for $42.00 per share in cash. rue21 filed for Chapter 11 bankruptcy protection on May 16, 2017, and emerged on September 22, 2017, after the company's reorganization plan was confirmed by the U.S. Bankruptcy Court for the Western District of Pennsylvania. New owners include hedge funds BlueMountain Capital Management, Southpaw Asset Management and Pentwater Capital Management.

History
In February 2002, Pennsylvania Fashions Inc., filed for Chapter 11 bankruptcy protection. It was then that SKM emerged as the majority stakeholder three years after Cary Klein sold a 50% stake to the Stamford, Connecticut-based investment firm. At the time sales among the nearly 250 stores were thought to be between $180 and $200 million annually with approximately 1,800 employees.

The company exited Chapter 11 as rue21 Inc. in May 2003 after undergoing voluntary reorganization. It set out an ambitious plan to expand its 170 stores over the next five years. Their ability to expand into underserved markets is evident by the store growth from their 500th store in Harlingen, TX on July 23, 2009 through November 14, 2013, when they opened their 1000th store in Enid, Oklahoma.

rue21 continued its growth and expansion on March 17, 2011 by announcing that it would be doubling the size of its  Distribution Center located in Weirton, West Virginia. This expansion occurred 12 months after a Distribution Center upgrade that included a new pack-to-light system as well as upgrades to the warehouse management system. CFO Keith McDonough stated, "The recently completed Distribution Center upgrades, including additional packing capacity, new systems and performance metrics, coupled with this planned expansion, gives us the ability to support our current stores and gives us the flexibility for our planned future growth."
 This upgrade was completed in June 2012.

In April 2017, rue21 announced plans to close around 400 stores, part of an American retail phenomenon of store closings known as the retail apocalypse. On May 16, 2017, rue21 filed for Chapter 11 bankruptcy protection, and emerged on September 22, 2017 after reorganization plan approval by the U.S. Bankruptcy Court for the Western District of Pennsylvania. "We are very pleased to have moved through the restructuring process in a relatively short period," CEO Melanie Cox said in a statement at the time of the plan's court confirmation.

In February 2020, rue21 shared that more of their branches will start offering plus sizes by the end of the first quarter of the year.

Brands
rue21 offers its own brands, such as rue21 etc.!, CARBON elements, RAE, true by rue21, ruebeauty, ruebleu SWIM, rueDecor, in addition to other brands in its stores to create merchandise excitement and differentiation in its stores. Its website displays selected inventory that is available in their brick & mortar stores. As of November 2013, U.S.-based customers have been able to purchase merchandise off of the redesigned website. In select stores rue21 also offers rueGuy, an expanded men's department with a more male-inspired layout, design, and fashion selection.

On November 6, 2014, rue21 began offering plus sizes for women, in various categories of merchandise, with their rue+ brand.

References

External links
Official website

Companies based in Allegheny County, Pennsylvania
Companies formerly listed on the Nasdaq
Retail companies established in 1970
Clothing retailers of the United States
Companies that filed for Chapter 11 bankruptcy in 2002
Companies that filed for Chapter 11 bankruptcy in 2017
American companies established in 1970
1970 establishments in Pennsylvania